Minium is the naturally occurring form of lead tetroxide, Pb2+2Pb4+O4 also known as red lead. Minium is a light-to-vivid red and may have brown-to-yellow tints. It typically occurs in scaly-to-earthy masses. It crystallizes in the tetragonal crystal system.

Minium is rare and occurs in lead-mineral deposits that have been subjected to severe oxidizing conditions. It also occurs as a result of mine fires. It is associated with cerussite, galena, litharge, massicot, mimetite, native lead, and wulfenite.

It occurs in relatively small amounts throughout the world: Langhecke, Hesse; Badenweiler, Baden-Württemberg; Bleialf, Eifel district; Horhausen, Rhineland-Palatinate in Germany. It occurs at Mies, Slovenia; Leadhills, Lanarkshire, Scotland; Castelberg St. Avold, Moselle, France; from Langban, Varmland, Sweden; Sarrabus, Sardinia, Italy; near Anarak, Iran; and Tsumeb, Namibia. It also occurs in Eschuchapa and Guerrero, Mexico. Good specimens were produced by a mine fire at the Broken Hill mine in New South Wales, Australia.

Minium has been identified as one of the pigments at Angkor Wat in Cambodia. 

Minium was named for the Iberian river known to the imperial Romans as Minius, now known as the Spanish Miño and the Portuguese Minho.  The name was originally applied to certain forms of cinnabar that had been coated with the minium oxide; however, once the red lead contaminant was determined to be chemically distinct from cinnabar crystals, the name, minium, was applied.

For properties and uses of minium see lead tetroxide.

References

Lead minerals
Pigments
Inorganic pigments
Tetragonal minerals
Minerals in space group 135